Shadow of the Scorpion is a novel by Neal Asher, published by the Macmillan Publishers imprint Tor Books in 2008. The novel introduces Ian Cormac and is therefore a prequel. The novel skips between Cormac's first mission for the ECS (Earth Central Security) and his upbringing as a child.

Planets

 Earth
 Hagren, the setting of the majority of the book
 Patience, the setting of the conclusion of the book

Spaceships

 Pearl - AI controlled Polity transport. 
 The Sadist - An AI controlled attack ship.

Characters

 Amistad
 Yallow
 Ian Cormac
 Carl
 Spencer
 Dax Cormac (Ian's older brother)
Hannah Cormac (Dax and Ian's mother)
 Gorman
 Travis
 Crean

External links
Review

2008 novels
2008 science fiction novels
Tor Books books